Thomas Batten (born in 1955) is an American politician. He served as a Republican member of the Nevada Assembly from 1994 to 1996 representing District 27 (covering part of Washoe County including part of Reno).

Background
Before being elected to the legislature, Batten was a police officer who received a degree in police science from Tidewater Community College in Virginia Beach, Virginia. Along with Bernice Mathews and Maurice Washington who took office at the same time, Batten was the first Black member of the Nevada Legislature from outside Clark County.

Elections

References

1955 births
Living people
People from Reno, Nevada
Politicians from Reno, Nevada
Tidewater Community College alumni
Republican Party members of the Nevada Assembly
20th-century American politicians